KLNE may refer to:

 KLNE-FM, a radio station (88.7 FM) licensed to Lexington, Nebraska, United States
 KLNE-TV, a television station (channel 26, virtual 3) licensed to Lexington, Nebraska, United States